The Nandi Awards are presented annually in Andhra Pradesh, For Telugu cinema by State government. "Nandi" means "bull", the awards being named after the big granite bull at Lepakshi — a cultural and historical symbol of Andhra Pradesh. Nandi Awards are presented in four categories: Gold, Silver, Bronze, and Copper.

2003 Nandi Awards Winners List

References

2003
2003 Indian film awards